Ultimate Basketball is an NES basketball video game. It was released in September 1990 by American Sammy. This video game is completely unrelated to the Amiga video game of same title and was represented on the American television series Video Power.

Gameplay

The game plays like a conventional sports video game. The player chooses from a list of 7 teams, and controls five players on the team on the court, though only one player may be directly controlled at a time. There is a championship mode and a single game mode in the game.

The game is unlike later sports based video games in that doesn't use real professional or college basketball players. The players a player may select for a team are entirely fictional, as are their statistics.

It was possible for so many players to foul out that only three or four were on the floor at the end of the game. In the Japanese version, a generic cheerleader comes over to the player and kisses him for winning the championship.

Teams
New York Powers
Los Angeles Eagles
Detroit Unions
Chicago Wolves
San Diego Dolphins
Dallas Fighters
Houston Comets

Reception
AllGame gave this video game a score of 3.5 out of 5 in their overview.

References

External links
 Ultimate Basketball at GameFAQs
 
 Taito Basketball at Superfamicom.org

1990 video games
Aicom games
Basketball video games
Multiplayer and single-player video games
Nintendo Entertainment System games
Nintendo Entertainment System-only games
Side-scrolling video games
Sports video games set in the United States
Video games developed in Japan